Daintar Pass is a mountain pass to the northeast of Mehrbani Peak in the northwest of Chaprote.

References

External links
Pakistan Adventure

Mountain passes of Khyber Pakhtunkhwa